John Dobson (7 May 1929 - 12 September 2009) was a former solicitor and unionist politician in Northern Ireland.

Born in Lurgan, Dobson studied at Lurgan College and Trinity College Dublin.  He joined the Ulster Unionist Party and was elected to Banbridge Urban District Council in 1961, serving until 1967.  In 1965, he was elected to the Northern Ireland House of Commons, representing West Down.  From 1968 he served as Chairman of the backbench grouping, the 66 Committee, standing down the following year, when he was appointed Minister and Leader of the House of Commons, a post he held until 1971.

References

Councillors in County Down
Members of the Privy Council of Northern Ireland
Members of the House of Commons of Northern Ireland 1962–1965
Members of the House of Commons of Northern Ireland 1965–1969
Members of the House of Commons of Northern Ireland 1969–1973
Solicitors from Northern Ireland
Ulster Unionist Party members of the House of Commons of Northern Ireland
People educated at Lurgan College
Members of the House of Commons of Northern Ireland for County Down constituencies
Ulster Unionist Party councillors
1929 births

2009 deaths